It is possible to convict someone of murder without the purported victim's body in evidence. However, cases of this type have historically been hard to prove, often forcing the prosecution to rely on circumstantial evidence, and in England there was for centuries a mistaken view that in the absence of a body a killer could not be tried for murder. Developments in forensic science in recent decades have made it more likely that a murder conviction can be obtained even if a body has not been found.

History 
For centuries in England there was a mistaken view that without a body there could be no trial for murder, a misconception that arose following the Campden Wonder case of 1660. A local man had vanished, and after an investigation three individuals were hanged for his murder. Two years later, the supposed victim appeared alive and well, telling a story of having been abducted and enslaved in Turkey. The mistaken view of "no body, no murder" persisted into the 20th century; in the case of Mamie Stuart, who disappeared in late 1919, her husband George Shotton was not charged despite significant circumstantial evidence because her body had not been found.

The English murderer John George Haigh believed that dissolving a body in acid would make a murder conviction impossible. He had misinterpreted the Latin legal phrase corpus delicti (referring to the body of evidence which establishes a crime) to mean an actual human body. But evidence of a body was presented at his 1949 trial: part of the dentures from his last victim. Her dentist was able to identify them; Haigh was found guilty and hanged.

In 1951, New Zealand criminal George Cecil Horry was convicted of the murder of his wife, although her body was never found. The Horry case helped to overturn in other common law jurisdictions the long-standing expectation that such cases would fail.

In the UK, the misapprehension that a killer could not be convicted solely on circumstantial evidence was directly addressed in the 1954 case of Michail Onufrejczyk. He and a fellow Pole, Stanislaw Sykut, had stayed in the United Kingdom after the Second World War and ran a farm together in Wales. Sykut disappeared and Onufrejczyk claimed that he had returned to Poland. Bone fragments and blood spatters were found in the farm kitchen, although forensic technology was then insufficiently advanced to identify them. Charged with Sykut's murder, Onufrejczyk claimed that the remains were those of rabbits he had killed, but the jury disbelieved him and he was sentenced to death, but reprieved. He appealed, but this was dismissed by the Lord Chief Justice, Lord Goddard, saying that "things had moved on since the days of the Campden Wonder", and

The 1960 California case of People v. Scott held that "circumstantial evidence, when sufficient to exclude every other reasonable hypothesis, may prove the death of a missing person, the existence of a homicide and the guilt of the accused".

In Australia, circumstantial evidence was originally deemed sufficient to obtain a murder conviction in the murder of Louis Carron, and in others such as the "dingo baby case" and Bradley John Murdoch.

In Singapore, law student Sunny Ang was hanged in Changi Prison on 6 February 1967 for the alleged murder of his girlfriend during a scuba diving trip near Sisters' Islands. He was convicted purely based on circumstantial evidence and without a body, as his girlfriend's corpse was lost at sea and never found. Francis Seow, prosecuting, said in his opening statement, "This is an unusual case insofar as Singapore, or for that matter Malaysia, is concerned. This is the first case of its kind to be tried in our courts that there is no body." But he said that it would not mean that crafty killers would get away with murder and escape the brunt of the law. It would only mean that the burden of proof of the prosecution was higher, a burden which was eventually met and led to Ang's conviction.

Other modern cases

1980s
In 1984, Mark Tildesley, a seven-year-old schoolboy, disappeared after leaving his home to go to the fairground in Wokingham, England. In 1990, it emerged that on the night he disappeared, Tildesley had been abducted, drugged, tortured, raped and murdered by a London-based paedophile gang led by Sidney Cooke. Leslie Bailey was charged with murder in 1991 and the following year was given two life sentences. Bailey was murdered in prison by other inmates shortly afterwards. The case remains officially unsolved despite being featured heavily in the national press and on BBC TV's Crimewatch.

In June 1985, Bournemouth woman Carole Packman, suddenly vanished from her family home. Her husband, Russell Causley wasn’t investigated for some eight years after his wife’s disappearance. It was only after Russell Causley faked his death in a £1 million life insurance fraud that the police looked in to his missing wife. Causley was and remains the first person in Britain to be convicted of the same murder twice, by a jury in the absence of a body and any evidence other than purely circumstantial.

In 1988, Helen McCourt, a 22-year-old insurance clerk from Lancashire disappeared. Ian Simms, a local pub landlord, was subsequently charged with and convicted of her murder. This case was also one of the first in the UK to use DNA fingerprinting.

American courts have also been allowed to press murder charges even if a body has not been recovered. In 1990, a Connecticut jury convicted Newtown airline pilot Richard Crafts of killing his Danish wife, Helle, in the 1986 "woodchipper murder", so called for the machine he had rented to dispose of her body in nearby lakes and streams. He was sentenced to 50 years in prison. The state police's forensic unit, led by Henry Lee, was able to match the DNA of some of the fragments that were discovered to Helle Crafts and the wood chipper her husband had used. It was the first bodyless murder trial in the state's history.

1990s

In April 1994, Heidi Allen, 18, of New Haven, New York, was abducted from the convenience store where she worked. Her body has never been found. Brothers Gary and Richard Thibodeau were charged with kidnapping and murder. They were tried separately. Gary was found guilty and sentenced to 25 years to life, while Richard was acquitted.

In 1996, Thomas Capano was convicted of the murder of Anne Marie Fahey, his former lover. Investigators did not have a murder weapon or body, nor any evidence that Capano had purchased a gun. He was convicted of first-degree murder in part due to the evidence given by his brother, Gerry, who had admitted to helping Capano dump Fahey's body in the Atlantic Ocean.

Sante Kimes and her son Kenneth were convicted of the murder of Irene Silverman, whose body was never found. They were also both suspects in another murder in the Bahamas where the body was never located. Kenneth eventually confessed to both murders but Sante Kimes maintained her innocence until she died in prison in 2014.

In May 1999, the New Zealand High Court convicted Scott Watson of the murder of Ben Smart and Olivia Hope. Their bodies have never been found.

2000s
In 2000, prosecutors in Orange County secured New York State's first-ever bodyless murder conviction. Gregory Chrysler and Lawrence Weygant were found guilty of beating coworker Dominick Pendino to death with a baseball bat and disposing of his body. They mistakenly believed Pendino had given police the tip that had led to their arrest on drug-dealing charges. They relied on eyewitness testimony from a former girlfriend and police informant, as well as forensic evidence showing that enough of Pendino's blood stained a car seat for him to have died without immediate medical attention. Neither the body nor the bat have been recovered: Chrysler and Weygant are still in prison and refuse to say where the remains are.

In June 2001, Essex teenager Danielle Jones went missing. Despite her body never being found, circumstantial evidence was provided by forensic analysis of text messages sent by her uncle Stuart Campbell, who was convicted of her murder 18 months later. Police determined that Campbell had sent messages from Jones's phone to his own after she disappeared, to make it appear that she was still alive, and noted that the spelling of several words changed after she was reported missing. Their suspicions were supported by records showing that Campbell's and Jones's phones were close to  each other when the messages were sent.

In October 2001, in Neuburg an der Donau, Germany,  vanished. He drank excessively, and was not well-liked. His wife, their two daughters and the elder daughter's fiancé all gave police confessions and they were convicted of manslaughter, or being an accomplice to manslaughter. There was no physical evidence of a crime. In 2009, Rupp's car—and his body—were found in the Danube, seemingly having got there after a collision. A retrial was held in 2010. All the original convictions were quashed on the grounds of insufficient evidence.

In 2002, Girly Chew Hossencofft's husband and his mistress were convicted of her murder, which occurred in 1999. Hossencofft's remains have never been located.

In spite of advances in forensic technology, the possibility of the supposed victim turning up alive remains. In 2003, Leonard Fraser, having allegedly confessed to the murder of teenager Natasha Ryan, was on trial for this, and other murders, when she reappeared after having been missing for four years.

In 2006, prosecutors in Nashville, Tennessee, had Perry March arrested and extradited from Mexico after he had been secretly indicted on charges of murdering his wife Janet, who had disappeared in 1996. An attempt to have March's in-laws killed while March was awaiting trial led to the arrest of his father, who as part of a plea agreement confessed to burying his daughter-in-law in a pile of brush near Bowling Green, Kentucky, but he was unable to lead police to the body after the intervening nine years. Perry March was convicted in 2006 almost ten years to the day after his wife disappeared.

In the Australian no-body trial for the murder of Keith William Allan, evidence from forensic accountants established a motive. The chance police finding of one perpetrator driving Allan's car and the conduct of all perpetrators, in particular mobile telephone records, were also important factors in their conviction.

In 2007, in Omaha, Nebraska, Christopher Edwards was convicted of murdering his girlfriend Jessica O'Grady, whose body has never been found. His mattress was soaked with her blood.

In 2008, Hans Reiser was convicted of first-degree murder of his wife, Nina Reiser.  After conviction and before sentencing, Reiser pleaded guilty to the lesser charge of second-degree murder in exchange for disclosing the location of his wife's body.

2010s
In 2012, in Scotland, the prosecution secured two convictions without a body, for the murder of Suzanne Pilley and the murder of Arlene Fraser. In 2019, again in Scotland, the prosecution secured a conviction without a body for the murder of Margaret Fleming  

In May 2013, Mark Bridger was convicted of the murder of April Jones, a five-year-old girl from Machynlleth, Wales, who disappeared on 1 October 2012. At his trial, Bridger claimed to have run her down in his car and killed her by accident, and to have no memory of what he did with her body after drinking heavily. The jury rejected his version of events, as bone fragments and blood discovered in Bridger's house within days of her disappearance were matched to the DNA of Jones. Her body was not found, despite the largest missing person search in UK history. Bridger claimed in court that Jones's DNA was found in his house as he had held her body there before disposing of it, but his claims were not believed by the jury.

On 12 July 2016, in Singapore, 48-year-old Leslie Khoo Kwee Hock allegedly killed his 31-year-old girlfriend Cui Yajie, a Tianjin-born Chinese engineer, in his car during a heated argument nearby Gardens by the Bay. Khoo took the body to a forest in Lim Chu Kang where he burnt the body for three days before he was arrested. By the time Khoo took the police to where he burnt the body, there were only ashes and a few clumps of hair, along with a bra hook and pieces of burnt fabric (from Cui's dress). Khoo was found guilty of murder on 12 July 2019, and a month later, on 19 August 2019, he was sentenced to life imprisonment.

On 30 August 2022 Christopher Dawson was found guilty by a New South Wales court, of the murder of his former wife Lynette 40 years previously; despite the fact that her body was never found. In delivering his verdict, the judge in the case said: ''“None of the circumstances considered alone can establish Mr Dawson’s guilt, but when regard is had to their combined force, I am left in no doubt. The only rational inference [is that] Lynette Dawson died on or about 8 January 1982 as a result of a conscious or voluntary act committed by Christopher Dawson.”

See also 
Adolph Luetgert
Henri Désiré Landru
List of murder convictions without a body
Seznec affair
Lupara bianca

References 

Criminology
English criminal law
Murder
Scottish criminal law